Paul Patrick Marak (born August 2, 1965), is a former Major League Baseball pitcher who played in  with the Atlanta Braves. He batted and threw right-handed. Marak had a 1-2 record, with a 3.69 ERA, in seven games, in his one-year career.

Born in England, Marak was raised in Alamogordo, New Mexico.

Marak attended Trinidad State Junior College in Trinidad, Colorado. He was drafted by the Braves in the 11th round of the 1985 amateur draft. He retired from professional baseball in 1993.

References

External links

1965 births
Living people
Major League Baseball pitchers
Major League Baseball players from the United Kingdom
Major League Baseball players from England
English baseball players
Atlanta Braves players
Richmond Braves players
Charlotte Knights players
Iowa Cubs players
Durham Bulls players
Greenville Braves players
Sumter Braves players
Idaho Falls Braves players
St. Paul Saints players
People from Lakenheath
Sportspeople from Suffolk
Trinidad State Trojans baseball players